The Magellanic Bridge (MBR) is a stream of neutral hydrogen that links the two Magellanic Clouds, with a few known stars inside it.  It should not be confused with the Magellanic Stream, which links the Magellanic Clouds to the Milky Way. It was discovered in 1963 by J. V. Hindman et al.

There is a continuous stream of stars throughout the Bridge linking the Large Magellanic Cloud (LMC) with the Small Magellanic Cloud (SMC). This stellar bridge is of greater concentration in the western part. There are two major density clumps, one near the SMC, the other midway between the galaxies, referred to as the OGLE Island.

References

External links
 SIMBAD, "Magellanic Bridge" (accessed 12 April 2010)

Magellanic Clouds
Milky Way Subgroup
H I regions
?